Ingram is a village in Rusk County, Wisconsin, United States. The population was 78 at the 2010 census.

Geography
Ingram is located at  (45.505794, -90.816255).

Ingram is along U.S. Highway 8, Wisconsin Highway 73, and County Road B.

Demographics

2010 census
As of the census of 2010, there were 78 people, 32 households, and 21 families living in the village. The racial makeup of the village was 98.7% White and 1.3% Native American.

There were 32 households, of which 37.5% had children under the age of 18 living with them, 40.6% were married couples living together, 12.5% had a female householder with no husband present, 12.5% had a male householder with no wife present, and 34.4% were non-families. 28.1% of all households were made up of individuals, and 18.8% had someone living alone who was 65 years of age or older. The average household size was 2.44 and the average family size was 3.05.

The median age in the village was 36 years. 32.1% of residents were under the age of 18; 5.1% were between the ages of 18 and 24; 23% were from 25 to 44; 19.2% were from 45 to 64; and 20.5% were 65 years of age or older. The gender makeup of the village was 48.7% male and 51.3% female.

2000 census
At the 2000 census, there were 76 people, 32 households and 20 families living in the village. The population density was 76.6 per square mile (29.6/km2). There were 38 housing units at an average density of 38.3 per square mile (14.8/km2). The racial makeup of the village was 100.00% White.

There were 32 households, of which 31.3% had children under the age of 18 living with them, 50.0% were married couples living together, 9.4% had a female householder with no husband present, and 37.5% were non-families. 34.4% of all households were made up of individuals, and 21.9% had someone living alone who was 65 years of age or older. The average household size was 2.38 and the average family size was 3.10.

Age distribution was 27.6% under the age of 18, 9.2% from 18 to 24, 30.3% from 25 to 44, 18.4% from 45 to 64, and 14.5% who were 65 years of age or older. The median age was 36 years. For every 100 females, there were 100.0 males. For every 100 females age 18 and over, there were 103.7 males.

The median household income was $29,375, and the median family income was $28,750. Males had a median income of $29,375 versus $17,500 for females. The per capita income for the village was $12,868. None of the population or families were below the poverty line.

References

Villages in Rusk County, Wisconsin
Villages in Wisconsin